Maniaiti / Benneydale is a small town in the Waitomo District.

History

Coal township

Coal was discovered in the area in 1931, and a mine was built at the town's present location. In 1940 the government bought the mine and created the township of Benneydale. Its name is a portmanteau of the undersecretary of mines at the time (Matt Benney) and the mine superintendent (Tom Dale). It was the only town in the King Country that does not have a Māori name.

At its peak the town had a population of 2000 with a butchery, bakery and picture theatre. There were jobs in the coal mine until the early 1990s, but like many other rural areas in New Zealand the town has slowly declined.

Modern history

Bush United is the town's local rugby union club, the clubhouse was built at Pureora in 1960 and was moved to Benneydale.

Bennydale now mainly operates as a farm service town and it is the closest town to the Timber Trail in the Pureora Forest Park. The town has a police station, volunteer fire brigade, a garage, a corner store that sells hot food and basic groceries, a cafe with accommodation, and a primary school. There is also a meat works on the outskirts of town.

In 2018 the Maniapoto Māori Trust Board lodged an application to the New Zealand Geographic Board to change the name to Maniaiti, which means "a small slide, slip" and is the name of a hill behind the township. It was decided that it would have a dual name of Maniaiti / Benneydale. There was substantial local opposition to the name change.

Demographics
The settlement is part of the larger Waipa Valley statistical area.

Bennydale had a population of 189 at the 2018 New Zealand census, an increase of 9 people (5.0%) since the 2013 census, and a decrease of 21 people (−10.0%) since the 2006 census. There were 72 households, comprising 99 males and 96 females, giving a sex ratio of 1.03 males per female. The median age was 36.0 years (compared with 37.4 years nationally), with 51 people (27.0%) aged under 15 years, 33 (17.5%) aged 15 to 29, 87 (46.0%) aged 30 to 64, and 15 (7.9%) aged 65 or older.

Ethnicities were 38.1% European/Pākehā, 60.3% Māori, 11.1% Pacific peoples, 11.1% Asian, and 3.2% other ethnicities. People may identify with more than one ethnicity.

Although some people chose not to answer the census's question about religious affiliation, 52.4% had no religion, 34.9% were Christian, 6.3% had Māori religious beliefs, and 4.8% were Muslim.

Of those at least 15 years old, 6 (4.3%) people had a bachelor's or higher degree, and 42 (30.4%) people had no formal qualifications. The median income was $21,000, compared with $31,800 nationally. 3 people (2.2%) earned over $70,000 compared to 17.2% nationally. The employment status of those at least 15 was that 63 (45.7%) people were employed full-time, 21 (15.2%) were part-time, and 6 (4.3%) were unemployed.

Waipa Valley statistical area

Waipa Valley had a population of 1,221 at the 2018 New Zealand census, a decrease of 30 people (−2.4%) since the 2013 census, and a decrease of 48 people (−3.8%) since the 2006 census. There were 465 households, comprising 642 males and 579 females, giving a sex ratio of 1.11 males per female. The median age was 39.6 years (compared with 37.4 years nationally), with 273 people (22.4%) aged under 15 years, 201 (16.5%) aged 15 to 29, 591 (48.4%) aged 30 to 64, and 156 (12.8%) aged 65 or older.

Ethnicities were 76.9% European/Pākehā, 28.7% Māori, 3.4% Pacific peoples, 3.4% Asian, and 1.5% other ethnicities. People may identify with more than one ethnicity.

The percentage of people born overseas was 10.3, compared with 27.1% nationally.

Although some people chose not to answer the census's question about religious affiliation, 53.6% had no religion, 33.4% were Christian, 2.2% had Māori religious beliefs, 0.2% were Hindu, 1.0% were Muslim, 0.2% were Buddhist and 1.2% had other religions.

Of those at least 15 years old, 114 (12.0%) people had a bachelor's or higher degree, and 228 (24.1%) people had no formal qualifications. The median income was $32,800, compared with $31,800 nationally. 114 people (12.0%) earned over $70,000 compared to 17.2% nationally. The employment status of those at least 15 was that 531 (56.0%) people were employed full-time, 174 (18.4%) were part-time, and 21 (2.2%) were unemployed.

Marae

Mangapeehi Marae is located near Benneydale. It is a meeting ground for the Ngāti Maniapoto hapū of Ngāti Matakore, Ngutu, Pare, Raukawa, Rereahu and Te Ihingarangi, and features the Rereahu meeting house.

Te Miringa te Kakara, a local meeting house, is located one kilometre from Benneydale, between Benneydale and Tiroa

Te Hape Marae and Te Kaha Tuatini meeting house is located east of Benneydale; it is a meeting place for the Rereahu hapū of Ngāti Te Rā and Ngāti Tuwhakahekeao.

Education

Notable people
 Keith Quinn, sports broadcaster

References

External links 
 1956 one inch map showing mines and tramway

Waitomo District
Populated places in Waikato
Populated places in Manawatū-Whanganui